Two ships of the United States Navy have been named Conecuh, after the Conecuh River in Alabama:
  was originally the German fleet replenishment oiler ; it was seized at the end of World War II and used by the U.S. Navy for experiments in operation of a combination oiler-replenishment ship.

Sources
 

United States Navy ship names